= Morad Saghafi =

- Born: 1957 (age 68–69); Tehran
- Occupations: Journalist political analyst activist

Morad Saghafi (Persian: مراد ثقفی; born 1957 in Tehran) is an Iranian journalist, political analyst, and activist. Saghafi is the editor of Goft-o-Gu (means Dialogue), a journal of research and opinion published in Tehran. Goft-o-Gu had an important role in explaining the theoretical concepts of civil society in Iran.

== Arrest ==
On 15 March 2017, Morad Saghafi was arrested during a crackdown on journalists, according to the ILNA news agency following his criticism of the Tehran Municipality and the then mayor. This followed a series of arrests in Iran targeted journalists criticizing the government.

== Selected works ==
The author has published several acclaimed articles including Why Iran Seems So Unpredictable. and the following:

- Saghafi, Morad; Ehsani, Kaveh (2004). ""The Temptation of Democracy": A Conversation with Morad Saghafi". Middle East Report. 212 (212): 47–51. doi:10.2307/3012916. JSTOR 3012916.
- Saghafi, Morad (2005). "Chapter 10: Three Sources of Anti-Americanism in Iran". In Judt, Tony; Lacorne, Denis (eds.). With Us or Against: Studies in Global Anti-Americanism Us. Palgrave Macmillan, New York. pp. 189–205. ISBN 978-0-230-60226-7.
- Saghafi, Morad (1997). "The return of Iranian exiles: an unfinished experience". Study Books on the Eastern Mediterranean and the Turkish-Iranian (24). doi:10.4000/cemoti.1450. ISSN 0764-9878.
- Saghafi, Morad (1996). "The fifth legislative election in Iran: the vote of an unloved republic". Study Books on the Eastern Mediterranean and the Turkish-Iranian (22). doi:10.4000/cemoti.146. ISSN 1777-5396.
- Saghafi, Morad (2001). "Crossing the desert: Iranian intellectuals after the Islamic revolution". Critique: Critical Middle Eastern Studies. 10 (18): 15–45. doi:10.1080/10669920108720176. S2CID 151585404.
- Saghafi, Morad; Lepen, Raphaëlle; Khatam, Azam; Merat, Zarir (2003). "An authoritarian regime in transition". Spirit. 296 (7): 145–158. ISSN 0014-0759. JSTOR 24248754.
- Saghafi, Morad; Ehsani, Kaveh (2004). "The New Landscape of Iranian Politics". Middle East Report. 233 (233): 16–23. doi:10.2307/1559446. JSTOR 1559446.
- Saghafi, Morad (2005). "Design of switched capacitor filters insensitive to element variations" (PDF). Lausanne. doi:10.5075/epfl-thesis-569.
